Lady Godiva: Back in the Saddle is a 2007 British comedy film directed by Baz Taylor and starring James Fleet, Caroline Harker and Phil Cornwell. It follows a teacher who attempts to stop an American gangster and a corrupt mayor building a casino on the site where Lady Godiva once rode in Coventry.

Cast
 Phil Cornwell - Mayor Osbourne
 James Fleet - Alan Jenkins
 Caroline Harker - Catherine Osbourne
 Nick Holder - Ray Carlton
 Matthew Ashforde - Vincent Dengler
 Zak Maguire - Andrew Osbourne
 Tony Slattery - Tom O'Driscoll
 Faye Tozer - Chantelle
 Mark Sutton - Carlton's Heavy 1
 Dave Bishop - Carlton's Heavy 2
 Joanna Croll - Jane Carmichael
 Emma Jesson - Serena Moss 
 Roger Sloman - Frank Gilmont
 Mohan Chopra - Sanjeev
 Christine Hamilton - Christina Hampton
 Neil Hamilton - Henry Hampton
 Dominic Cazenove - Michael Davies

Production
The project is fundraised by two Coventry businessmen, Heath Jones and Dennis Timothy, via their company Koralis Pictures, for 18 months as of May 2004. The company won funding from Enterprise Investment Scheme, but no financing support from the British film establishment. In Dec 2004, they ran into funding problem locally.

Because they were born and raised in Coventry, Mr. Jones said he hoped the film would do for Coventry what The Full Monty did for Sheffield. The film was originally expected to be directed by Mark L. Lester, but later changed to Baz Taylor who had worked on Auf Wiedersehen, Pet.

Release
The film premiered in UK on Nov 13, 2007 and open to the public on Nov 16.

References

External links

2007 films
2007 comedy films
Lady Godiva
2000s English-language films
2000s British films